Robert Leatham Simpson (August 8, 1915 – April 15, 2003) was a general authority of the Church of Jesus Christ of Latter-day Saints from 1961 until his death.

Simpson served as a missionary in the church's New Zealand Mission as a young adult. In the 1950s, Simpson returned to New Zealand as the mission president.

Simpson studied at Santa Monica City College.  He also was trained in the Technical Training Communication program held at Yale University during World War II.  Simpson and his wife, Jelaire Chandler, were the parents of three children.

Simpson became a general authority of the church in 1961 when he was asked to be the first counselor to Presiding Bishop John H. Vandenburg. Simpson served in this capacity until he and Vandenburg were released and made Assistants to the Quorum of the Twelve Apostles in 1972. In this calling, Simpson was the managing director of LDS Social Services (now renamed Family Services) from 1972 to 1974. In 1974, he became the head of the Melchizedek Priesthood MIA. In 1975, Simpson became the temporary president of the church's London Mission, replacing a president who became ill. When the calling of Assistant to the Twelve was discontinued in 1976, Simpson was added to the First Quorum of the Seventy, where he served until 1989, when he was made an emeritus general authority and relieved of full-time church duties.

As a member of the Seventy, Simpson served at various times as managing director of the church's Temple Department, president of the Pacific Area, president of the Los Angeles California Temple, a member of the general presidency of the Young Men Organization, as president of the England London East Mission, and as general president of the Sunday School.

Simpson died in St. George, Utah.

Notes

References
"Elder Robert L. Simpson," Ensign, July 1972, p. 11

External links

| colspan="3" style="text-align: center;" |Emeritus General AuthoritySeptember 30, 1989 – April 15, 2003First Quorum of the SeventyOctober 1, 1976 – September 30, 1989Assistant to the Quorum of the Twelve ApostlesApril 6, 1972 – October 1, 1976

1915 births
2003 deaths
20th-century Mormon missionaries
American Mormon missionaries in England
American Mormon missionaries in New Zealand
American general authorities (LDS Church)
Assistants to the Quorum of the Twelve Apostles
Counselors in the General Presidency of the Young Men (organization)
Counselors in the Presiding Bishopric (LDS Church)
General Presidents of the Sunday School (LDS Church)
Latter Day Saints from California
Latter Day Saints from Utah
Members of the First Quorum of the Seventy (LDS Church)
Mission presidents (LDS Church)
Santa Monica College alumni
Temple presidents and matrons (LDS Church)
Yale University alumni